The 2012 Seguros Bolívar Open Barranquilla was a professional tennis tournament played on clay courts. It was the second edition of the tournament which was part of the 2012 ATP Challenger Tour. It took place in Barranquilla, Colombia between 26 March – 1 April 2012.

Singles main draw entrants

Seeds

 1 Rankings are as of March 19, 2012.

Other entrants
The following players received wildcards into the singles main draw:
  Alejandro Falla
  Robert Farah
  Nicolás Massú
  Matías Sborowitz

The following players received entry from the qualifying draw:
  Andrés Molteni
  Nicholas Monroe
  Pedro Sousa
  Simon Stadler

Champions

Singles

 Alejandro Falla def.  Horacio Zeballos, 6–4, 6–1

Doubles

 Nicholas Monroe /  Maciek Sykut def.  Marcel Felder /  Frank Moser, 2–6, 6–3, [10–5]

External links
 Official Website
ITF Search
ATP official site

Seguros Bolivar Open Barranquilla
Seguros Bolívar Open Barranquilla
2012 in Colombian tennis